Dobrova may refer to:

Dobrova, Dobrova–Polhov Gradec, a settlement in the Municipality of Dobrova–Polhov Gradec, Slovenia
Dobrova-Polhov Gradec, a Municipality in Slovenia
Dobrova, Celje, Slovenia